The Anēwan, also written Anaiwan and Anaywan, are an Aboriginal Australian people whose traditional territory spans the Northern Tablelands in New South Wales. The Anēwan people are  a subgroup of the Djangadi tribe.

Language

The Anēwan language, also known as Nganyaywana, has been classified by Robert M. W. Dixon as belonging to the Djan-gadi/Nganjaywana subgroup of Central New South Wales, and was one of three varieties of the group, the other dialects being Himberrong and Inuwon. For a long time Anēwan was regarded, like Mbabaram, as a linguistic isolate, ostensibly failing to fit into the known Australian patterns of language, since the material in word-lists taken down of its vocabulary appeared to lack cognates in contiguous languages such as Gamilaraay. The status of its seeming irregularity was solved in 1976 by Terry Crowley who showed that the differences were caused by initial consonant loss which, once accounted for, yielded up over 100 cognate terms between Anēwan and other languages and dialects of the region. One of the peculiarities generated by this phenomenon of initial loss was that many homophones were created between originally distinct words, so that in Anēwan the word for goanna and bull ant became identical (janda).

Country
Northwest their borders ran to Tingha, and encompassed also Bendemeer and Armidale. Neighbouring tribes were the Baanbay to their east; the Djangadi to the south-east, the Yugambal and Ngarabal to their north, and the Gamilaraay to the west.

Social structure
The Anēwan consisted of several clans, one of which was the Himberrong horde.
Their section names were:
 Irong feminine Arkan
 Arpong feminine Iran
 Iyong feminine Patjang
 Imbong feminine Irakena.

The Irong intermarried with the Iyong, and the Arpong with the Imbong.

History
By the time R. H. Mathews began to record elements of the Anēwan language in 1903, remnants of the original tribe had been widely dispersed over New England. Those who remained in Armidale lived on a site on the town fringes known as "The Dump", in humpies built close to the rubbish tip, which were devoid of the basic amenities of water, sewerage and electricity, and jerry-rigged by using hessian bags, corrugated sheet iron and cardboard boxes. In 1960, four children died and 11 were hospitalised from infections picked up in conditions that were called "appalling". The government then allocated funds to clean up the area and built cottages in fibro cement for its residents. Eventually, these were replaced by brick units in a settlement which the local Aboriginal community named Narwan.

Some words
 dunya (penis)
 gyaya (food)
 ilgaiwa (summer)
 jarrwanba (winter)
 mbunya (mbanyja) (kangaroo)

Notable people
Kyah Simon, international soccer player

Notes

Citations

Sources

Aboriginal peoples of New South Wales